Huang Meixia (born 16 November 1958) is a Chinese rower. She competed in the women's coxed four event at the 1984 Summer Olympics.

References

1958 births
Living people
Chinese female rowers
Olympic rowers of China
Rowers at the 1984 Summer Olympics
Place of birth missing (living people)